Lisbjerg Power Station (Danish: Lisbjerg Forbrændingen) also known as Affaldscenter and Biomassefyret Kraftvarmeværk A/S is a combined heat and power plant in Lisbjerg, Denmark. The power plant is composed of two units; a waste-to-power incinerator and a biomass plant. The official address is Ølstedvej 20-36, 8200 Aarhus N and it is managed by AffaldVarme Aarhus as a part of the Teknik og Miljø (Technology and Environment) magistrate of Aarhus Municipality. The biomass facility supplies district heating to 20% of homes in Aarhus Municipality and it is one of the largest of its kind in Denmark.

History 
The original waste-to-power incinerator colloquially known as Lisbjerg Forbrændingen, officially AffaldsCenter, was constructed in 1976-78 as a combined heat and power plant. The facility has been expanded and changed a number of times most recently from 2004 to 2007  In 2014 construction of a biomass plant, Biomassefyret Kraftvarmeværk, began as an addition to the existing facility. The biomass plant is a part of wider plan of Aarhus Municipality to transition to renewable energy sources. It will primarily burn hay sourced from the local area. The two facilities share the same buildings and some of the infrastructure but are managed as separate units due to the differences in source and waste materials.

Architecture 
The architect firm Friis & Moltke designed the initial facility in 1978 and have since been involved in most major changes and renovations. The largest design change occurred in 2004 following a contest held in 1999 and won by Friis & Moltke. The old buildings were encased in a shell of concrete, steel and glass which gives it a changing appearance depending on weather conditions. The overall design is divided in a "base" and a "glass shell" section. The base is a rigidly defined transport surface somewhat lowered into the terrain and partially hidden. The glass shell is placed on the base and is a glass structure encasing the original concrete structure while providing space for newer functions. A fissure in the shell makes room for the 110 meter chimney. The chaotic interior of boilers, pipes and machines can be discerned through the glass facade. Next to the power plant itself is a two story administration building, also with a glass facade, but in sharp contrast to the 4-5 times taller power plant structure.

Friis & Moltke also designed the addition of the biomass plant which started construction in 2014 with completion in late 2016. The biomass plant is constructed in a similar style to the existing structure and the infrastructure is integrated i.e. one shared chimney. The power plant is situated in hilly, undulating terrain and it is designed to fit the lines and colors of the surrounding landscape. It is prominently situated on a 70 meters tall hill and is visible from afar.

Lisbjerg Forbrændingen 
Lisbjerg Forbrændingen, also known as AffaldsCenter Lisbjerg, is the original waste-to-power facility which also contains a recycling station, toxic waste center and a number of waste disposal systems apart from the power plant itself. Annually it processes 670.000 metric tons of waste of which 225.000 tons is used for energy production. It can process 23 tons of was per hour and produces 76 MV heat for district heating and 18.9 MV electricity. Annually it produces 470.000 MWh heat and 120.000 MWh electricity. The waste products are 40.000 tons of slag, 2700 tons of metal recyclables and 7000 tons of waste from flue gas treatment. The flue gas waste is exported while slag is used in place of gravel for road fill.

Biomassefyret Kraftvarmeværk 
Biomassefyret Kraftvarmeværk (Biomass combined heat and power plant), is the biomass plant added in 2016. Construction began in 2014 and was completed in 2016. The biomass plant annually processes 230.000 metric tons of hay and has storage for 3168 haybales which cover 66 hours of production. The biomass plant is rated for 37 MV of electricity production and 77 MV of heating (110 MW primary energy). The plant is designed primarily for hay but can use up to 50% wood chips. Some 4% of the burned matter is converted to ash which is sold as fertilizer for agriculture.

See also 

 List of power stations in Denmark

References

External links 
 

Cogeneration power stations in Denmark
Waste power stations in Denmark
Biomass power stations in Denmark
Buildings and structures in Aarhus Municipality